Cefmetazole is a cephamycin antibiotic, usually grouped with the second-generation cephalosporins.



Adverse effects
The chemical structure of cefmetazole, like that of several other cephalosporins, contains an N-methylthiotetrazole (NMTT or 1-MTT) side chain. As the antibiotic is broken down in the body, it releases free NMTT, which can cause hypoprothrombinemia (likely due to inhibition of the enzyme vitamin K epoxide reductase) and a reaction with ethanol similar to that produced by disulfiram, due to inhibition of aldehyde dehydrogenase.

Spectrum of bacterial susceptibility
Cefmetazole is a broad-spectrum cephalosporin antimicrobial and has been effective in treating bacteria responsible for causing urinary tract and skin infections. The following represents MIC susceptibility data for a few medically significant microorganisms.
 Bacteroides fragilis: 0.06 - >256 µg/ml
 Clostridium difficile: 8 - >128 µg/ml
 Staphylococcus aureus: 0.5 - 256 µg/ml (includes MRSA)

References

Acetaldehyde dehydrogenase inhibitors
Cephalosporin antibiotics
Tetrazoles
Nitriles
Carboxamides